James Barron Carey (August 12, 1911 – September 11, 1973) was a 20th-century American labor union leader; secretary-treasurer of the Congress of Industrial Organizations (CIO) (1938–55); vice-president of AFL–CIO (from 1955); served as president of the United Electrical Workers (UE) (1936–41) but broke with it because of its alleged Communist control. He was the founder and president (1950–65) of the rival International Union of Electrical, Radio and Machine Workers. President Truman appointed Carey to the President's Committee on Civil Rights in 1946. Carey was labor representative to the United Nations Association (1965–72). Carey helped influence the CIO’s pullout from the  World Federation of Trade Unions (WFTU) and the formation of the International Confederation of Free Trade Unions (ICFTU) dedicated to promoting free trade and democratic unionism worldwide.

Background
James Barron Carey, of Irish descent, was born in Philadelphia, Pennsylvania on August 12, 1911, one of the eleven children of John C. and Margaret ( Loughery) Carey. His father was a paymaster at the United States Mint in Philadelphia. Carey attended St. Theresa's Parochial School. The family moved to Glassboro, New Jersey where he graduated from Glassboro High School. At the age of fourteen he was making trellises in a local factory after school hours and during summers; while still in school he worked part-time as an apprentice projectionist in a Glassboro motion picture theater. The head projectionist, who was an officer in the film operators' union, reportedly gave Carey the theory and practice of the labor movement.

Career

Union career

Carey's first job was as an electrical worker in the radio laboratory of the Philadelphia Storage Battery Company (later the Philco Corporation). He began in 1929 and while taking evening courses in electrical engineering at Drexel Institute.

Carey and six other workers at the Philco plant started the "Phil-Rod Fishing Club," primarily to organize a union. Discontinuing his studies at Drexel Institute, during 1931-32 Carey he attended the University of Pennsylvania's Wharton School of Finance and Commerce, where he took evening courses in industrial management, business forecasting, and finance. Under the National Industrial Recovery Act in June 1933, the radio factory set up a "Company Congress" to meet NRA collective bargaining requirements.

October 1933 Carey was sent as a delegate from his local to the convention of the American Federation of Labor (AFL). Two months later, representatives of a dozen AFL and independent unions in the radio and electrical industries met in New York, established the Radio and Allied Trades National Labor Council, and elected Carey (then 22 years old) its first president. 

Carey became President of the United Electrical Workers (UE) in 1936, during its formation. Under Carey’s leadership, the UE formed an affiliation with the new Congress of Industrial Organizations (CIO).  In 1941, he broke with the UE due to Communist control.

From 1938 to 1955, Carey served as secretary-treasurer of the Congress of Industrial Organizations (CIO).

In 1948, Max Lowenthal, a Truman insider, recorded in his 1948 diary that Carey was CIO president Philip Murray's main conduit.  He recorded a conversation in his diary thus:   M(ax):  You know that although Jim Carey sees you, Phil Murry has been saying for three years that he has no real access to the White House.  D(avid): You should see how much Jim Carey has been in my hair these past few weeks!

In 1950, Carey helped found and became first president of UE rival International Union of Electrical, Radio, and Machine Workers, also known as the International Union of Electrical Workers (IUE), which the CIO helped found and where he served until 1965.  Today, the IUE is part of the Communications Workers of America (CWA).

In 1955, when the CIO rejoined the AFL to form the AFL-CIO, Carey became vice-president of AFL–CIO.

Government service

In 1946, U.S. President Harry S. Truman appointed Carey to the President's Committee on Civil Rights. 

From 1965 to 1972, Carey served as labor representative to the United Nations Association, where he helped influence the CIO’s pulling out from the WFTU and forming of an alternative International Confederation of Free Trade Unions (ICFTU) organization, dedicated to promoting free trade and democratic unionism worldwide.

Personal and death
Carey married the former Margaret McCormick in 1938. They had two children, James and Patricia.

Carey died on September 11, 1973, of a heart attack at his home in Silver Spring, Maryland. He was survived by his wife and children. He was interred at Gate of Heaven Cemetery in Silver Spring, Maryland.

Legacy

The James B. Carey Library at Rutgers University is named for him. An exhibition documenting his career, "James B. Carey: Labor's Boy Wonder," was produced at Rutgers in 2006. 

More of Carey's archival records are housed at the Walter P. Reuther Library of Labor and Urban Affairs, the Harry S. Truman Library and Museum and the John F. Kennedy Presidential Library and Museum.

References

External sources

 Carey, James B. (1960). Reminiscences of James Barron Carey: oral history, 1958 (abstract). Columbia Center for Oral History. . Retrieved March 19, 2016. 

American trade union leaders
1973 deaths
1911 births
American Roman Catholics
Burials at Gate of Heaven Cemetery (Silver Spring, Maryland)
Glassboro High School alumni
People from Glassboro, New Jersey
People from Philadelphia
Trade unionists from Pennsylvania
United Electrical, Radio and Machine Workers of America people
Congress of Industrial Organizations people